Ann-Kristin "Grynet" Molvig (born 23 December 1942 in Rygge) is a Norwegian actress and singer. She made her name as a singer in the 1960, with acts such as Kjell Karlsen and Willy Andresen. Later, she also started performing in Sweden, often together with Povel Ramel. At the same time, she also acted in films, both in Norway and Sweden. 

In 1967, she won the award for Best Actress at the 5th Moscow International Film Festival for her role in The Princess.

In 2006, she returned to the stage after a long absence, with a role in the musical Sweet Charity.

Molvig has been married three times, secondly to the Norwegian composer Alfred Janson and later to the Swedish count Carl Adam Lewenhaupt ("Noppe"). With Janson, she had a son, Teodor Janson, also an actor.

Select filmography
Sønner av Norge (1961)
Operasjon Løvsprett (1962)
Sailors (1964)
Stompa forelsker seg (1965)
The Princess (1966)
Spader, Madame! (1969)
The Man Who Quit Smoking (1972)
SOPOR (1981)
Folk og røvere i Kardemomme by (1988)

References

External links

1942 births
Living people
People from Rygge
Norwegian stage actresses
Norwegian women singers
Melodi Grand Prix contestants
Norwegian musical theatre actresses
Norwegian film actresses